Johannes Seland (14 September 1912 – 31 December 1999) was a Norwegian politician for the Liberal Party.

He served as a deputy representative to the Norwegian Parliament from Vest-Agder during the term 1954–1957.

He was also the editor-in-chief of Fædrelandsvennen as well as mayor of Flekkefjord.

References

1912 births
1999 deaths
Deputy members of the Storting
Liberal Party (Norway) politicians
Norwegian newspaper editors
Mayors of places in Vest-Agder
Place of birth missing
Place of death missing
20th-century Norwegian writers